Michael von Deinlein (26 October 1800, Hetzles, Upper Franconia – 4 January 1875, Bamberg) was a German Roman Catholic priest, bishop and archbishop.

Life 
He studied theology and philosophy in Bamberg and was ordained a priest on 18 November 1824. He then became a cathedral chaplain and assistant pastor from 1827 in 1830 in Coburg, among other roles. He later became regent and professor of moral theology at the Lyzeum in Bamberg.

In 1841 he became a canon and in 1844 vicar general. In 1853 pope Pius IX made him an auxiliary bishop in Bamberg and titular bishop of Adramyttium. He was ordained bishop on 20 November 1853 by Karl-August von Reisach. From 1851 to 1856 he chaired the Bamberg Historical Society. 

In 1856 he became bishop of Augsburg and was awarded the Merit Order of the Bavarian Crown. In 1858 he became archbishop of Bamberg, a role he held until his death. He hosted the nineteenth Katholikentag in Bamberg from 31 August to 3 September 1868. He opposed the dogma of papal infallibility at the First Vatican Council from 1869 to 1870, but left the council of bishops early to avoid having to vote on the matter.

References

External links 
 
 Michael Deinlein on catholic-hierarchy.org
 Biography of Michael von Deinlein

1800 births
1875 deaths
Roman Catholic bishops of Augsburg
Archbishops of Bamberg
Members of the Bavarian Reichsrat
Participants in the First Vatican Council